Müschenbach is an Ortsgemeinde – a community belonging to a Verbandsgemeinde – in the Westerwaldkreis in Rhineland-Palatinate, Germany.

Geography

Müschenbach lies 3 km from Hachenburg at the “entrance” to the Kroppach Switzerland (Kroppacher Schweiz). Hiking paths lead into the nearby valley of the river Nister and to the Marienstatt Monastery.

History
In 1359, Müschenbach had its first documentary mention.

Politics

The municipal council is made up of 17 council members, including the extraofficial mayor (Bürgermeister), who were elected in a majority vote in a municipal election on 13 June 2004.

Regular events
The yearly kermis, the Brunnenfest (“Well Festival”) and the Carnival with its parade are the community's highlight events alongside the Meilerfest (“Charcoal Kiln Festival”) with a genuine charcoal kiln and the attendant charcoal makers. This is held every four years.

Economy and infrastructure
In the community are a primary school and a kindergarten. As well, there are a Bürgerhaus (“Citizens’ House”) with a community library, as well as an educational path in the forest and a hiking path network.

Transport
Müschenbach is linked to the long-distance road network by Bundesstraße 414. The Autobahn interchanges Mogendorf and Dierdorf on the A 3 (Cologne–Frankfurt) can be reached by Bundesstraßen 8 and 413. The community is connected to the Deutsche Bahn railway network.

References

External links
Müschenbach in the collective municipality’s Web pages 

Municipalities in Rhineland-Palatinate
Westerwaldkreis